Beixia Street Subdistrict is a subdistrict within the Guancheng Hui Ethnic District of Zhengzhou, Henan, China. It is home to the administrative offices of the district.

Administrative divisions 
The subdistrict is divided into 7 residential communities:

 Shangcheng Road Residential Community
 Beixia Avenue Residential Community
 Guancheng Avenue Residential Community
 Daishu Hutong Residential Community
 Xichang Residential Community
 Xingyue Residential Community
 Beishuncheng Avenue Residential Community

Cultural sights 
The subdistrict is home to the Beidajie Mosque, a cultural center for the area's Hui Muslim population, which possibly dates back to the Ming Dynasty.

References 

Township-level divisions of Henan
Subdistricts of the People's Republic of China
Guancheng Hui District